Narayanacharya may refer to:

 Narayanacharya (1600 - 1660) - an Indian philosopher of Dvaita Vedanta